Marinobacter maritimus is a Gram-negative, psychrotolerant and motile bacterium from the genus of Marinobacter which has been isolated from sea water near the Kerguelen islands.

References

Further reading

External links
Type strain of Marinobacter maritimus at BacDive -  the Bacterial Diversity Metadatabase	

Alteromonadales
Psychrophiles
Bacteria described in 2005